Patrice Mae San Pedro Impelido (born October 9, 1987) is an Australian-born Filipina footballer and currently an assistant coach for the Philippines.

Early life
Patrice Impelido was born in Sydney, Australia on 9 October 1987. Her family has roots tracing to the Philippines and moved to Australia because of a job transfer Impelido's father received. In 1990, Impelido's family moved to the United States following another job transfer her father received. Her family settled in Glen Ellyn, Illinois.

Impelido started playing football at a young age and because of her family's connection with the sport. Patrice's sister Angeline, who is four years older than her, served as a role model to her and stated that football was one of her sister's interest. Impelido's father was also a coach and taught her the game.

International career
Philippine head coach Marlon Maro invited Patrice Impelido to try out for the team and was accepted to the national team. Her older sister Angeline Impelido was already playing for the national team at that time and later played football with her during the 2005 and 2007 Southeast Asian Games. Impelido was first called up to the Philippine national team for the 2005 Southeast Asian Games where she played as a midfielder. She later played as a scoring center back for her national team. She made her first international goal against Laos at the 2007 Southeast Asian Games in a match that ended in a 2–2 draw. She was also credited for scoring the sole goal against the Japanese U–23 team at the 2013 AFF Women's Championship which ended in a 1–4 defeat. Impelido had turns with assuming the role of team captain with Samantha Nierras.

At the 2018 AFC Women's Asian Cup, Impelido was designated as captain of the national team along with Tahnai Annis though Impelido herself has yet to play in an Asian Cup match.

Career statistics

International goals
Scores and results list the Philippines' goal tally first.

References

1987 births
Living people
Filipino women's footballers
Philippines women's international footballers
Soccer players from Sydney
Australian people of Filipino descent
Citizens of the Philippines through descent
Australian women's soccer players
Women's association football midfielders
Western Michigan Broncos women's soccer players
American sportspeople of Filipino descent
Soccer players from Illinois
People from Glen Ellyn, Illinois
Western Michigan University alumni
Competitors at the 2017 Southeast Asian Games
Competitors at the 2019 Southeast Asian Games
Southeast Asian Games competitors for the Philippines